Beaufort railway station is located on the Serviceton line in Victoria, Australia. It serves the town of Beaufort, and it opened on 11 August 1874.

History

Beaufort station opened on 11 August 1874, when the railway line from Ballarat opened. It remained a terminus until 7 April 1875, when the line was extended to Ararat. Like the town itself, the station was named after Sir Francis Beaufort, a hydrographer and rear admiral of the British Royal Navy.

On 14 September 1988, it was disestablished as a staff station, with the signal box, interlocking and signals abolished. The electric staff sections Trawalla - Beaufort and Beaufort - Buangor were also abolished, replaced with the electric staff section Trawalla - Buangor. In May 1989, two loop lines that formed a rail yard were removed.

In October 1993, station staff were withdrawn, with platform seats also removed in that month. On 27 May 1994, the station closed when road coaches replaced services between Ballarat and Ararat.

In 2000, the station building and signal box underwent a restoration, to make it more suitable for community use. By August 2003, upgrades to reopen the station were complete. On 11 July 2004, the station reopened when V/Line passenger services to Ararat resumed.

In October 2014, the former station building was converted into a community arts centre, whilst the former goods shed is currently used as a steam-era museum.

Disused stations Burrumbeet and Trawalla are located between Beaufort and Wendouree, while disused station Buangor is located between Beaufort and Ararat.

Platforms and services

Beaufort has one platform. It is serviced by V/Line Ararat line services.

Platform 1:
  services to Ararat and Southern Cross

Transport Links

V/Line operates a road coach service via Beaufort station:
 Ballarat – Adelaide via Ararat, Stawell, Horsham and Dimboola

References

External links
 Victorian Railway Stations gallery
 When there were Stations gallery
 Melway map at street-directory.com.au

Railway stations in Australia opened in 1874
Regional railway stations in Victoria (Australia)
Shire of Pyrenees